Cairo attack may refer to:

1948 Cairo bombings
Cairo–Haifa train bombings 1948
1981 Assassination of Anwar Sadat
1990 Cairo bus attack
1996 Cairo shooting
April 2005 Cairo terrorist attacks
February 2009 Cairo terrorist attacks
2011 Imbaba church attacks, near Cairo
2011 attack on the Israeli Embassy in Egypt
January 2014 Cairo bombings
2015 Cairo restaurant fire
2015 Bombing of the Cairo Italian Consulate
2017 Attack on Saint Menas church, Cairo
2019 Cairo bombing

See also
Timeline of terrorism in Egypt (2013–present)